Stockholm International Peace Research Institute (SIPRI) is an international institute based in Stockholm. It was founded in 1966 and provides data, analysis and recommendations for armed conflict, military expenditure and arms trade as well as disarmament and arms control. The research is based on open sources and is directed to decision-makers, researchers, media and the interested public.

SIPRI's organizational purpose is to conduct scientific research in issues on conflict and cooperation of importance for international peace and security, with the goal of contributing to an understanding for the conditions for a peaceful solution of international conflicts and sustainable peace.

SIPRI was ranked among the top three non-US world-wide think tanks in 2014 by the University of Pennsylvania Lauder Institute's Global Go To Think Tanks Report. In 2020, SIPRI ranked 34th amongst think tanks globally.

History

In 1964, Prime Minister of Sweden Tage Erlander put forward the idea of establishing a peace research institute to commemorate Sweden's 150 years of unbroken peace.

A Swedish Royal Commission chaired by Ambassador Alva Myrdal proposed in its 1966 report to establish an institute, later named the Stockholm International Peace Research Institute, SIPRI. The institute's research should seek to contribute to "the understanding of the preconditions for a stable peace and for peaceful solutions of international conflicts" and the Commission recommended that research be concentrated on armaments, their limitation and reduction, and arms control. The commission also recommended that SIPRI work is of "an applied research character directed towards practical-political questions [which] should be carried on in a constant interchange with research of a more theoretical kind".

SIPRI has built its reputation and standing on competence, professional skills, and the collection of hard data and precise facts, rendering accessible impartial information on weapon developments, arms transfers and production, military expenditure, as well as on arms limitations, reductions and disarmament. The task of the institute is to conduct "scientific research on questions of conflict and cooperation of importance for international peace and security with the aim of contributing to an understanding of the conditions for peaceful solution of international conflicts and for a stable peace".

The Swedish Riksdag decided that the Institute be established on 1 July 1966 with the legal status of an independent foundation.

Organisation

SIPRI's organisation consists of a governing board, director, deputy director, research staff collegium and support staff. The governing board takes decisions on important matters concerning the research agenda, activities, organisation and financial administration of the institute. Other matters are decided by the director. The research staff collegium advises the Director on research matters.

The staff of 84 employees is mainly international, with a representation of 27 different nationalities reported in 2021. The researchers are recruited for specific project periods and represent various academic disciplines. SIPRI also hosts guest researchers who work on issues related to research programmes as well as interns in relevant fields whose programmes of study can contribute to and benefit from SIPRI's research.

The institute works in a global network, with partnerships and cooperation between other institutes and with individual scientists. SIPRI has close cooperation with many multilateral organisations, for example, the United Nations and the European Union. SIPRI is frequently visited by government delegations, parliamentarians as well as researchers from the academic sphere. The institute keeps close connections with the diplomatic body in Stockholm.

Governing board
Current members of the Governing Board: 

 Stefan Löfven (Sweden), former Prime Minister of Sweden, as of 1 June 2022, Chair of the SIPRI Governing Board
 Dr Mohamed Ibn Chambas (Ghana), former Special Representative of the United Nations Secretary-General for West Africa and Head of the UN Office for West Africa (UNOWAS)
 Ambassador Chan Heng Chee (Singapore), Ambassador-at-Large, Singapore Ministry of Foreign Affairs
Jean-Marie Guéhenno (France), Senior Advisor, Centre for Humanitarian Dialogue and a member of the UN Secretary General High-Level Advisory Board on Mediation
 Dan Smith (United Kingdom), Director, SIPRI
Patricia Lewis (United Kingdom/Ireland), Research Director, International Security at Chatham House
 Radha Kumar (India), chair, United Nations University Council
 Jessica Tuchman Mathews (United States), Former President of Carnegie Endowment for International Peace and current Distinguished Fellow
 Feodor Voitolovsky (Russia), Director, Primakov Institute of World Economy and International Relations (IMEMO), Russian Academy of Sciences

Former Governing Board Chairpersons:
 Alva Myrdal (1966–67)
 Gunnar Myrdal (1967–73)
 Rolf Edberg (1974–78)
 Hans Blix (1978)
 Karin Söder (1978–79)
 Rolf Björnerstedt (1979–85)
 Ernst Michanek (1985–87)
 Inga Thorsson (1987–91)
 Daniel Tarschys (1992–2000)
 Rolf Ekeus (2000–10)
 Göran Lennmarker (2010–14)
 Sven-Olof Petersson (2014–2017)
 Jan Eliasson (2017–2022)

Director
The Director, who is appointed by the Swedish Government, has the main responsibility for SIPRI's work programme. Dr Bates Gill served as SIPRI Director from 2007 to 2012. In September 2012, the Swedish Government appointed the German economist Tilman Brück as his successor. Brück held the position of SIPRI Director from January 2013 to June 2014. In June 2014 the SIPRI Governing Board appointed Dr Ian Anthony as Director for an interim period. The current Director, Dan Smith, was appointed in September 2015.

Former SIPRI Directors:
 Robert Neild (United Kingdom, 1967–71)
 Frank Barnaby (United Kingdom, 1971–81)
 Frank Blackaby (United Kingdom, 1981–86)
 Walther Stützle (Germany, 1986–91)
 Adam Daniel Rotfeld (Poland, 1991–2002)
 Alyson Bailes (United Kingdom, 2002–07)
 Bates Gill (United States, 2007–12)
 Tilman Brück (Germany, 2013–14)
 Ian Anthony (United Kingdom, interim 2014–15)

Research

Research is conducted at SIPRI by an international staff of about 46 researchers and research assistants. The institute's current research programme centres on the following major themes: 
 Armament and Disarmament
 Conflict, Peace and Security
 Peace and Development

With the following research areas: 

 Arms and Military Expenditure
 Chemical and biological weapons
 Dual-use and Arms Trade Control
 Emerging Military and Security Technologies
 EU Non-Proliferation and Disarmament Consortium
 Weapons of mass destruction
 Nuclear disarmament, Arms Control and Non-proliferation
 Africa
 Asia
 Europe
 Middle East and North Africa
 Peace Operations and Conflict Management
 Climate Change and Risk
 Environment of Peace
 Food, peace and security
 Governance and Society
 Peacebuilding and Resilience

Publications and information
SIPRI's publications and information material are distributed to a wide range of policy makers, researchers, journalists, organisations and the interested public. The results of the research are disseminated through the publication of books and reports by SIPRI and commissioned authors as well as through symposia and seminars. The institute has forged its profile by concentrating on present-day realities, providing unbiased facts to states and individuals. 

SIPRI's main publication, the SIPRI Yearbook, was first published on 12 November 1969. The Yearbook serves as a single authoritative and independent source to which politicians, diplomats and journalists can turn for an account of what has happened during the past year in armaments and arms control, armed conflicts and conflict resolution, security arrangements and disarmament. It is translated into a number of other languages, notably Arabic, Chinese, Russian and Ukrainian. The summary of the SIPRI Yearbook is available in several languages, including Catalan, Dutch, French, Italian, Korean, Persian, Spanish and Swedish.

SIPRI series:
 SIPRI Yearbook: Armaments, Disarmament and International Security
 SIPRI Yearbook summary Yearbook in English and a number of other languages
 Oxford University Press publications
 SIPRI research papers and reports
 SIPRI policy briefs, papers and reports
 SIPRI fact sheets and background papers
 SIPRI databases

SIPRI Databases 

SIPRI's research projects maintain large databases on military expenditure, arms-producing industries, arms transfers, chemical and biological warfare, national and international export controls, arms control agreements, annual chronologies of major arms control events, military manoeuvres and nuclear explosions.

SIPRI Arms Transfers Database 
Showing all international transfers of major conventional arms since 1950, The SIPRI Arms Transfers Database is the most extensive source of information on international arms transfers available to the public. The database is updated every spring and is useful for anyone seeking to monitor and measure the international flow of major conventional arms.

SIPRI Mapping ATT-Relevant Cooperation and Assistance Activities Database 
The SIPRI Mapping ATT-relevant Cooperation and Assistance Activities Database covers cooperation and assistance activities in regards to arms transfer and small arms and light weapons (SALW) controls since 2012. The database supports state's implementation of two treaties – the 2001 UN Programme of Action on SALW and the 2013 Arms Trade Treaty.

SIPRI Arms Industry Database 
The SIPRI Arms Industry Database reports on the top 100 largest arms-producing and military services companies.

SIPRI Multilateral Peace Operations Database  
This database contains data on personnel, country contributions, fatalities and budgets for all multilateral peace operations from the year 2000 and onwards.

SIPRI Military Expenditure Database 
The Military Expenditure Database reports on the annual military spending of most countries around the world.

Events and conferences 

Within the fields of study, SIPRI arranges numerous workshops, conferences, seminars and lectures, bringing together an all-encompassing spectrum of expertise to exchange views on relevant themes. Among these events, the largest are the Stockholm Forum on Peace and Development, the Stockholm Security Conference and SIPRI Lecture. The 2021 Stockholm Security Conference was held in a virtual format on the topic 'Battlefields of the Future: Trends of Conflict and Warfare in the 21st Century' and gathered over 870 global participants across 17 thematic sessions. In 2022, Stockholm Forum on Peace and Development was held in a hybrid format, convening over 2600 registrants from over 150 countries to live streamed high-level panels and online discussions on the theme of 'From a Human Security Crisis Towards an Environment of Peace'. The 2022 SIPRI Lecture was held on the theme of 'Environment of Peace' and was delivered by HE Helen Clark, former Prime Minister of New Zealand and Administrator of the United Nations Development Programme.

Partnerships

SIPRI is part of the Stockholm Hub on Environment, Climate and Security, which provides evidence-based insights on building security and prosperity and how to strengthen resilience in the face of a changing climate. The Stockholm Hub connects the expertise of SIPRI to three other leading research institutes: the Stockholm Environment Institute (SEI), the Stockholm International Water Institute (SIWI), and the Stockholm Resilience Centre at Stockholm University (SRC). The Stockholm Hub is funded by the Swedish Ministry of Foreign Affairs.

Researchers
Florian Krampe, PhD

Finances

SIPRI's financial support is primarily drawn from governments and independent philanthropic organisations around the world. SIPRI also receives annual support from the Swedish government in the form of a core grant approved by the Swedish parliament.

See also

Peace research institutes
 Bonn International Centre for Conflict Studies
 Geneva International Peace Research Institute
 Journal of Peace Research
 Peace Research Institute Frankfurt
 Peace Research Institute Oslo
 Tami Steinmetz Center for Peace Research

Military budgets
 List of countries by military expenditures
 United Nations Security Council:
 Military budget of China

 Military budget of Russia

 Military budget of the United States

Notes and reference

External links
 

1966 establishments in Sweden
Organizations established in 1966
Organizations based in Stockholm
International organizations based in Sweden
Peace and conflict studies
Research institutes in Sweden
Research institutes of international relations
Arms control
Weapons trade